Nybrua is a tram station which was opened in February 2021. It is served by lines <span style="color:green">11</span style>, <span style="color:purple">12</span style>, <span style="color:red">17</span style> and <span style="color:yellow">18</span style>. It is located near where the old tram station, Hausmanns gate stood. It is located between Storgata (westbound) and Schous plass (Grünerløkka-Torshov Line) and Heimdalsgata (Sinsen Line). It is served with both SL79 and SL95 trams. SL18 trams also serve the station on routes 17 and 18.

History 

In the past, a station called Nybrua was served by lines 11, 12 & 13 and it was located on Thorvald Meyers gate. Unfortunately, it was closed temporarily in 2012 and again in 2015 permanently due to its proximity to other stations nearby. In the late 2010s, the street of Storgata was closed for repair and Hausmanns gate was disestablished in the process. Between 2018 and 2021, a replacement tram track was constructed and Lilletorget was created, which temporarily replaced both Brugata and Hausmanns gate.   On the 15th of February, the current stop ouside of the Legevakten was opened.

References 

Oslo Tramway stations in Oslo